Wali Hasan Tonki (born; 1924 - 3 February 1995) was a Pakistani Mufti, Islamic scholar, judge and writer.

Early life and education
Wali Hasan was born in 1924 to Mufti Anwarul Hassan Khan in Tonk district. His father and grandfather,  Muhammad Hassan Khan were muftis in the Sharia Court of Tonk. He studied Persian and other books of Arabic from his father. His father died when he was 11. In 1936 his paternal uncle Haider Hassan Khan took him to Darul-uloom Nadwatul Ulama and studied for four years. And then he studied random books from his paternal uncle in Tonk. After the death of his paternal uncle, he served for many years in the Sharia Court of Tonk. During this period, he passed the Maulvi examination from University of Allahabad and Maulvi Alam and Fazil from Panjab University. Then entered in Mazahir Uloom and complete Dars-i Nizami. Then he studied in Darul Uloom Deoband under Husain Ahmad Madani.

Career
After studies, he was appointed as Mufti and Judge in a Sharia court at Chhabra Gugor till the partition of India. He migrated to Pakistan and taught at  Metropolis High School, Karachi. He later taught at the Madrasa Imdadul Uloom and at the Jamia Uloom-ul-Islamia.

He founded Iqra Rozatul Atfal Trust, and also served as its first president.

Literary works
Tonki wrote books and his articles appeared in various journals. His books include:
 Tazkira Auliya i Hind wa Pakistan
 Aaili Qawaneen Shariat ki Roshni main
 Bima Ki Haqeeqat
 Qurbani Ke Ahkam Masail
 Fitna Inkar-e-Hadees

Death
He died on Friday, 3 February 1995. His funeral prayers were led by Abdul Rasheed Nomani and according to his will, he was laid to rest in Darul Uloom Karachi cemetery.

References

1924 births
1995 deaths
Grand Muftis of Pakistan
People from Tonk district
University of Allahabad alumni
Panjab University alumni
Mazahir Uloom alumni
Darul Uloom Deoband alumni
Darul Uloom Nadwatul Ulama alumni
Academic staff of Jamia Uloom-ul-Islamia
Darul Uloom Karachi people
Pakistani Islamic religious leaders
Deobandis
Pakistani Sunni Muslim scholars of Islam
Sharia judges
People from Karachi